Gurum is a small town and township of Doilungdêqên District in the Tibet Autonomous Region of China.

See also
List of towns and villages in Tibet

Populated places in Lhasa (prefecture-level city)
Township-level divisions of Tibet
Doilungdêqên District